Garra flavatra can also be called Panda Garra, is a species of cyprinid fish in the genus Garra.

References

Garra
Fish described in 2004